Parfums d'Extrêmes is the first solo album of Dantès Dailiang. The French-Chinese double album was released in 2006 with Kexue Records and distributed in China in 2007 with Jiesheng Records. The Chinese name of the album is Wo jide ni 我记得你. The double album was noted by both Chinese media and French media (specializing in China) as the first album written and performed in Mandarin Chinese by a Frenchman and then distributed throughout China.

Songs 
CD1

 我记得你 
 你的爱到底给了谁 
 只有她 
 因为有爱
 两千年我来到中国 
 留下许多情
 掉在你的路上
 我希望
 I still love you
 生命中的篇章 
 有你伴我到明天

CD2
 Et si j'oubliais
 J'ai plus envie
 Eden
 Ivre là-bas 
 Libre 
 Ce soir
 Un homme sage
 C'est la seule
 I still love you
 Tayatimtim
 Je me souviens de toi

2006 albums